Bathytoma pacifica is an extinct species of sea snail, a marine gastropod mollusk in the family Borsoniidae.

Distribution
This extinct marine species was endemic to the Eocene of Southern California in the age range between 55.8 Ma to 48.6 Ma.

Description
This species is considered an epifaunal carnivore.

References

 R. L. Squires. 2001. Additions to the Eocene megafossil fauna of the Llajas Formation, Simi Valley, southern California. Contributions in Science (Natural History Museum of Los Angeles County) 489:1-40

pacifica